The teams competing in Group 3 of the 2004 UEFA European Under-21 Championships qualifying competition were Czech Republic, Netherlands, Austria, Belarus and Moldova.

Standings

Matches
All times are CET.

Goalscorers
4 goals
 Ihar Razhkow

3 goals

 David Kobylík
 Youssouf Hersi

2 goals

 Jakub Bureš
 Jiří Koubský
 Mario Lička
 Václav Svěrkoš
 Serghei Dadu

1 goal

 Andreas Ivanschitz
 Roman Kienast
 Roland Linz
 Joachim Parapatits
 Florian Sturm
 Pavel Byahanski
 Timofei Kalachev
 Artem Kontsevoy
 Dmitry Rubnenko
 Aleh Shkabara
 Maksim Tsyhalka
 Pavel Fořt
 Martin Kolář
 David Lafata
 Jaroslav Plašil
 Aleš Schuster
 Miroslav Slepička
 Jordi Hoogstrate
 Santi Kolk
 Eddy Putter

1 own goal

 Khalid Boulahrouz (playing against Moldova)
 Jeffrey Leiwakabessy (playing against Belarus)

External links
 Group 3 at UEFA.com

Group 3